60S ribosomal protein L17 is a protein that in humans is encoded by the RPL17 gene.

Ribosomes, the organelles that catalyze protein synthesis, consist of a small 40S subunit and a large 60S subunit. Together these subunits are composed of 4 RNA species and approximately 80 structurally distinct proteins. This gene encodes a ribosomal protein that is a component of the 60S subunit. The protein belongs to the L22P family of ribosomal proteins. It is located in the cytoplasm. This gene has been referred to as RPL23 because the encoded protein shares amino acid identity with ribosomal protein L23 from Halobacterium marismortui; however, its official symbol is RPL17. Two alternative splice variants have been observed, each encoding the same protein. As is typical for genes encoding ribosomal proteins, there are multiple processed pseudogenes of this gene dispersed through the genome.

References

Further reading

External links 
 

Ribosomal proteins